The North Central Texas Council of Governments or NCTCOG is a voluntary association of governments in the Dallas/Fort Worth Metroplex.  Its ranks currently include 230 member governments including 16 counties, numerous cities, school districts, and special districts. Based in Arlington, the North Central Texas Council of Governments is a member of the Texas Association of Regional Councils.

Purpose 
The purpose of NCTCOG is to "strengthen both the individual and collective power of local governments and to help them recognize regional opportunities, eliminate unnecessary duplication, and make joint decisions."

Organization 
Each member government appoints a representative from its governing body to the COG General Assembly.  This group meets annually to elect the Executive Board, a policy-making body for all NCTCOG activities composed of 18 officials.  The activities organized include regional plans, program activities and decisions, and fiscal and budgetary policies.  Within NCTCOG are technical, study, and policy development committees and a professional staff headed by Mike Eastland (the Executive Director) that support the Board.

Counties served

Largest cities in the region

Major cities

Cities and towns 100k-250k

Cities and towns 25k-99k

References

External links
nctcog.org, official website

Texas Association of Regional Councils